Dr. Socrates is a 1935 American crime film directed by William Dieterle and starring Paul Muni as a doctor forced to treat a wounded gangster, played by Barton MacLane.

Plot
The death of his fiancée in a car crash so unnerves top surgeon Dr. Lee Cardwell that he moves to a rural community and becomes a general practitioner, but he attracts few patients.  The local doctor calls him Dr. Socrates because he always has his head in a book of classics. 
 
Bank robber Red Bastian comes to him after he is shot in the arm during his latest caper. Lee treats Red, but is unwillingly to accept payment. Red, however, makes him take a $100 bill for his trouble.
  
Later on, while on his way to another bank job, Red picks up hitchhiker Josephine Gray.  While Red's gang is busy robbing the bank, Josephine tries to run away, but gets shot. She is treated by Dr. Socrates.  At first, the police think that she is a gang "moll", but she is cleared and recuperates at the doctor's home.

Red and his gang kidnap her and take her to their hideout, which the doctor had visited earlier on a medical call. He tells the police where to find the gang, but asks that they give him a chance to get Josephine safely away. He convinces the gang members that they need to be inoculated against an outbreak of typhoid fever, but what he really gives them is a knockout drug.  He takes care of Red himself.  Lee is a hero, and even the local doctor says nice things about him.

Cast
 Paul Muni as Lee
 Ann Dvorak as Josephine
 Barton MacLane as Red Bastian
 Robert Barrat as Dr. Ginder
 John Eldredge as Dr. Burton
 Hobart Cavanaugh as Stevens
 Helen Lowell as Ma Ganson
 Mayo Methot as Muggsy
 Henry O'Neill as Greer
 Grace Stafford as Caroline Suggs
 Samuel Hinds as Dr. McClintick
 June Travis as Dublin
 Raymond Brown as Ben Suggs
 Olin Howland as Bob Catlett
 Joseph Downing as Cinq Laval
 Grady Sutton as General Store Clerk
 Adrian Morris as Beanie - a Gangster

Critical reception
Writing for The Spectator in 1936, Graham Greene gave the film a poor review, dismissing it as "a third-rate gangster film". Despite comparing Paul Muni's performance to personality performers like Greta Garbo and Joan Crawford, Greene concludes that his effort in Dr Socrates "is not one of Muni's successful films". Whereas the film should have been exciting, all that the film could conjure up was funniness.

References

External links
 
 
 
 

American crime drama films
American black-and-white films
Films based on short fiction
Films based on works by W. R. Burnett
Films directed by William Dieterle
1935 crime drama films
Films with screenplays by Robert Lord (screenwriter)
Films produced by Robert Lord (screenwriter)
1935 films
Warner Bros. films
1930s American films
Films scored by Heinz Roemheld
Films scored by Bernhard Kaun